Tereza Kmochová (born 26 September 1990) is a Czech deaf female alpine skier. She has represented Czech Republic in Winter Deaflympics, Winter Universiade and in the FIS Alpine World Ski Championships. She generally competes in the women's combined, slalom, giant slalom, Super-G events at international alpine skiing competitions. She is considered one of the finest deaflympic alpine skiers to have competed at the Deaflympics and also regarded as a finest athlete to have represented Czech Republic at the Deaflympics with a record haul of 10 medals including 7 gold medals. In the 2015 Winter Deaflympics she created history after winning gold medals in all five events such as giant slalom, super combined, slalom, downhill and Super-G.

Tereza Kmochová was awarded the ICSD Deaf Sportswoman of the Year award in 2015 for her achievements in the sport of alpine skiing especially claiming five gold medals during the 2015 Winter Deaflympics which was held in Russia. She was also nominated for the ICSD Deaf Sportswoman of the Year award in 2007 and 2010.

Despite her deafness, she was eligible to represent Czech Republic in the 2015 Winter Universiade, 2017 Winter Universiade, FIS Alpine World Ski Championships 2011 and FIS Alpine World Ski Championships 2017. Tereza Kmochova was also the part of the Czech delegation which clinched the gold medal in the Parallel mixed alpine skiing team event during the 2017 Winter Universiade.

References

External links 
 Profile at data.fis-ski
 Profile at Eurosport
 Profile at 2015 Winter Deaflympics
Profile at 2015 Winter Universiade
 ICSD Deaf Sportsperson of the Year award in each years
 website

1990 births
Living people
Czech female alpine skiers
Deaf skiers
Sportspeople from Prague
Czech deaf people
Universiade gold medalists for the Czech Republic
Universiade medalists in alpine skiing
Competitors at the 2017 Winter Universiade
Deaflympic alpine skiers of the Czech Republic
Deaflympic gold medalists for the Czech Republic
Deaflympic silver medalists for the Czech Republic
Deaflympic bronze medalists for the Czech Republic
Medalists at the 2007 Winter Deaflympics
Medalists at the 2015 Winter Deaflympics
Medalists at the 2019 Winter Deaflympics
Alpine skiers at the 2007 Winter Deaflympics
Alpine skiers at the 2015 Winter Deaflympics
Alpine skiers at the 2019 Winter Deaflympics
Competitors at the 2015 Winter Universiade